"Tonight" is a song by French band Phoenix, released as the third single from their seventh studio album, Alpha Zulu. It features Ezra Koenig of Vampire Weekend. The song was released on 7 September 2022 alongside its music video, which was filmed in Tokyo and Paris. 

The track marks the first time Phoenix have recorded with a guest vocalist.

The band performed the song on several late night talk shows, such as The Late Show with Stephen Colbert and Later... with Jools Holland.

The song was featured on the soundtrack for FIFA 23. This is the second Phoenix song placed in a sports video game, as "1901" was in NBA 2K13.

Charts

References

2022 singles
2022 songs
Glassnote Records singles
Phoenix (band) songs
Songs written by Thomas Mars
Songs written by Laurent Brancowitz